Gary Ford (born 8 February 1961) is an English former footballer who played on the right-wing.

He made 435 appearances in all competitions for York City, scoring 64 goals, between 1979 and 1987 – a tally beaten by only four York City players. He then moved on to Port Vale via Leicester City. He played on loan for Walsall, before signing with Mansfield Town in 1991. Two years later he joined Telford United, before heading to Norway with Tromsø IL and Harstad IL, before returning to England with Hartlepool United in 1995.

Career
Ford started playing with small York based team, Leeman United, and then turned professional with Charlie Wright's York City at 18-years-of-age in February 1979. The "Minstermen" were a mid-table Fourth Division team in 1978–79, but were only three points above the re-election zone in 1979–80. They finished bottom of the Football League in 1980–81, leading to Barry Lyons's departure as manager, before rising to 17th place in 1981–82. Following the arrival of new boss Denis Smith, York posted a seventh-place finish in 1982–83, lying just three places and four points outside the promotion places. They then ran away with the Fourth Division title in 1983–84, racking up 101 points and a goal difference ratio of +57. They finished eighth in the Third Division in 1984–85 and seventh in 1985–86, but only avoided relegation in 1986–87 by one place and four points. During his eight years at Bootham Crescent, Ford racked up 435 appearances in league and cup competitions.

After making a £25,000 transfer to Leicester City, he scored twice in sixteen Second Division appearances for the "Foxes" in 1987–88, before losing his place when Bryan Hamilton was replaced as manager by David Pleat. He was bought by Port Vale in December 1987 for a £35,000 fee, dropping down into the Third Division to join John Rudge's "Valiants". He scored three goals in 28 games in 1987–88. However, he tore an achilles tendon in November 1988 and struggled to make the first team until he underwent an operation to correct it in September 1989. He hit eight goals in 28 games in 1988–89, but his injury ruled him out of the play-off Final victory over Bristol Rovers. He recovered by March 1990 and went out to Walsall on loan, making 13 appearances for John Barnwell's "Saddlers" as they battled unsuccessfully to avoid finishing last in the Third Division. During the 1990–91 season he was in action fairly frequently, scoring twice in 35 appearances, but was transferred to George Foster's Mansfield Town in March 1991, along with £80,000, in exchange for Kevin Kent. After moving on to Telford United later that year he moved to Norway and plied his trade for Tromsø IL and Harstad IL. Tromsø finished sixth in the Tippeligaen in 1993 under the stewardship of Harald Aabrekk. Harstad finished fifth in the Norwegian Second Division in 1994, before winning promotion as Group 6 champions in 1995. He then returned to England and the Football League in 1995, making three appearances for Hartlepool United. He went on to work as a youth coach at York City and at York University.

Style of play
Ford was a winger known for his intelligent wide play and consistency.

Career statistics
Source:

Honours
York City
Football League Fourth Division: 1983–84

Harstad IL
Norwegian Second Division Group 6: 1995

References

Footballers from York
English footballers
Association football midfielders
York City F.C. players
Leicester City F.C. players
Port Vale F.C. players
Walsall F.C. players
Mansfield Town F.C. players
Telford United F.C. players
English expatriate footballers
Expatriate footballers in Norway
English expatriate sportspeople in Norway
Tromsø IL players
Harstad IL players
Hartlepool United F.C. players
English Football League players
Eliteserien players
Association football coaches
York City F.C. non-playing staff
York University
1961 births
Living people